The Kingston class consists of 12 coastal defence vessels operated by the Royal Canadian Navy. The class is the name for the Maritime Coastal Defence Vessel Project (MCDV). These multi-role vessels were built and launched from the mid- to late-1990s and are crewed by a combination of Naval Reserve and Regular Force personnel. The main mission of the vessels is to train reservists, coastal patrol, minesweeping, law enforcement, pollution surveillance and search and rescue duties. The multi-purpose nature of the vessels led to their mixed construction between commercial and naval standards. The Kingston class is split between the east and west coasts of Canada and regularly deploy overseas to West Africa, Europe, Central America and the Caribbean.

Background
The Kingston class was the result of the Maritime Coastal Defence Vessel Project (MCDV) in the late 1980s. The project came about due to four influences, along with restrictions. The vessels in use by the Canadian Forces Naval Reserve were ageing and needed replacement. At the time, the Maritime Command was using old s, s and s to train reservists, with the vast majority of the ships having begun service in the 1950s and early 1960s. The navy lacked a mine warfare capability. Furthermore, the new s were not capable of inshore and restricted area patrol and finally, the government sought to keep the shipbuilding efforts ongoing, as the frigate program was already well underway.

The MCDV project was also the culmination of a series of political promises offered by then Minister of National Defence Gilles Lamontagne. The government sought to move the National Reserve Headquarters from Halifax, Nova Scotia to Quebec City, Quebec as part of their effort to increase French representation in the armed forces. The move was to provide a site where French-Canadians could live and work in their native language. Lamontagne faced opposition within the Forces due to Quebec City being far from the existing naval bases and the waters around it freezing during winter months. Lamontagne promised to replace the ships for naval reserve training in order to move the project forward. The program began in the 1987 National Defence White Paper under the concept of  "Total Force". This was intended to mask reductions in the regular force by increasing the capabilities of the reserve forces. This led the navy to add minesweeping and coastal patrol duties to the reserve force's list of duties.

Design and description
There were five main criteria for the design. The ships had to be built in Canada, they had to be inexpensive to build, they had to be operable by naval reservists, the design had to have role flexibility included, and they had to be inexpensive to operate. This was exemplified by the Royal Navy's  which was operated by the Royal Navy Reserve. The design originally called for steel-hulled mine countermeasures vessels and training ships. The Kingston class were built to commercial standards to reduce costs with the exception of stability, maneuverability and the magazines which were constructed to naval standards. Their mixed construction is visible in their two square, separated funnels which were cheaper to manufacture, their poor seakeeping and large radar signature. The vessels were re-designated MCDV from MM (General Mine Warfare Vessel) when two follow-on programmes of purely minesweeper/hunters were cancelled, denoting their mixed duties.

The ships have a standard displacement of  light and  fully loaded. During sea trials, the vessels were found to be top heavy and a further  of permanent ballast was added. The vessels have a maximum crew of 47, with crew sizes changing depending on the vessel's task. The crew is a mix of reservists and regular force personnel, with the regular force personnel assigned to engine room and electronics tasks. The Kingston class are equipped with Kelvin Hughes Nucleus S-band surface search radar.

The Kingston class use an electric drive system that is powered by four Wärtsilä UD 23V12 diesel engines which are coupled to four Jeumont ANR 53-50-4 alternators, creating 715 kilowatts each. Two Jeumont C1 560 L electric motors provide power to the two LIPS FS-100 Z-drive azimuth thrusters which are fitted with fixed-pitch reversing propellers.

The Kingston class were initially armed with a single Bofors /60 calibre Mk 1N/1 anti-aircraft gun mounted in a Mk 5C Boffin mount and two single  Browning M2 machine guns. The Bofors guns were refurbished World War II models that had been previously used by the Canadian Army for air defence in Europe. The Bofors gun was mounted on the forecastle deck until their removal in 2014. The machine guns are mounted on either side at the front of the bridge deck. The 40 mm guns were used as monuments after being dismounted. In October 2006, Maritime Command experimented with mounting a remote controlled heavy machine gun station, the OTO Melara 12.7 mm RCHMG, in place of the 40 mm Bofors cannon aboard . The Nanuk .50 calibre RCWS from Rheinmetall was trialled as a replacement aboard  in 2018. All twelve ships have degaussing coil arrays fitted, but only the first three ships have the control system, with it situated between the two funnels.

Modular payload
On the aft sweep deck, there are three positions that can receive a variety of mission payloads in the form of  ISO containers. The Royal Canadian Navy has a limited number of each mission payload;

 Two Indal Technologies AN/SLQ-38 deep mechanical minesweeping systems
 Four MDA Ltd. AN/SQS-511 heavyweight high-definition Route Survey System
 One ISE Ltd. Trailblazer bottom object inspection vehicle
 One ISE Ltd. HYSUB 50 deep seabed intervention system
 Fullerton and Sherwood Ltd. six-man, two-compartment containerised diving systems
 MDA Ltd. Interim Remote Minehunting and Disposal System control van

Furthermore, the vessels have additional systems not in an ISO container format that can be fitted, including;
 Two L3/Klein K 5500 high definition side scan sonars
 Four L3/Klein K 3000 dual frequency side scan sonars
 Two Deep Ocean Engineering Inc. Phantom 4 remotely operated vehicles (ROV)

The modules are split between the naval bases on each coast. The Trailblazer module is based at CFB Esquimalt, there are two route survey modules per coast, and the two minesweeping modules are located at CFB Halifax. In November 2009, the Boeing Insitu ScanEagle unmanned aerial vehicle was successfully trialled aboard a Kingston-class vessel.

Modernisation
The Royal Canadian Navy discarded a $100-million mid-life refit plan for the twelve vessels in this class. It was intended to retain the "mid-lifed" vessels through 2045–2055. While the RCN concluded that the money would be better spent in acquiring a new platform, the Liberal Government's 2017 defence policy statement, Strong, Secure and Engaged, did not reference replacing these vessels. The RCN review listed low speed and small size as reasons for the MCDV being inadequate for patrol duties (both are factors of the original specification). Notwithstanding the success of the ships in their deployment, critics suggest that patrol and training were tacked onto the mine-countermeasures role and that the platform lacks serious armament for a sovereignty enforcement role.

In October 2011, L-3 MAPPS was awarded a contract to supply degaussing systems for the Kingston-class ships. The advanced degaussing systems were to be delivered and supported locally in collaboration with SAM Electronics. In November 2012 MacDonald, Dettwiler and Associates was awarded a two-year $13.4 million contract to repair and upgrade the deployable sonar systems.

In 2018 the Royal Canadian Navy acquired the UAV AeroVironment Puma II AE with Mantis i45 Sensor for use on the Kingston class.

Construction and career
In May 1992, a $CAN650 million contract was awarded to Halifax Shipyards of Halifax, Nova Scotia to construct twelve ships of the class. The vessels would be tasked with coastal patrol, minesweeping, law enforcement, pollution surveillance and search and rescue duties. Steel cutting for the first ship begin in December 1993 and by July 1999, all twelve Kingston-class ships would be in service. The ships are evenly distributed between the east and west coasts. One vessel on each coast is maintained for rapid deployment: this responsibility is rotated amongst the ships. The Kingston-class ships deploy regularly as part of Operation Caribbe in the Caribbean Sea and the Central American Pacific coast. The ships also deploy to the Arctic as part of Operation Nanook, and in naval exercises off the west coast of Africa and in the Baltic Sea among others. On 13 May 2010, it was announced that six of the twelve MCDVs would be placed in extended readiness due to lack of funds and the inability of the naval reserve to provide sufficient personnel to man the ships. However, on 14 May that order was rescinded.

Ships in class

See also

Notes

Citations

References

External links

 Canada’s Kingston-class Jack-of-all-Trades Vessels

 
Patrol ship classes
Naval ships of Canada